Leonard Hubert S Harben (12 July 1878 – 24 August 1941) was an English stage and film actor. He was married to the actress Mary Jerrold and father of celebrity chef Philip Harben.

Selected filmography
 Mr. Pim Passes By (1921)
 Every Mother's Son (1926)
 Tell England (1931)
 The Shadow Between (1931)
 Uneasy Virtue (1931)
 Fires of Fate (1932)
 Timbuctoo (1933)
 The House of Trent (1933)
 Lilies of the Field (1934)
 City of Beautiful Nonsense (1935)
 Scrooge (1935)
 Fighting Stock (1935)
 Whom the Gods Love (1936)
 Living Dangerously (1936)
 Dishonour Bright (1936)
 Sunset in Vienna (1937)
 For Valour (1937)
 Victoria the Great (1937)
 A Royal Divorce (1938)
 The Man at the Gate (1941)

References

External links
 

1878 births
1941 deaths
English male stage actors
English male film actors
Male actors from London
20th-century English male actors